Kelly Hollow (also spelled Kelley Hollow) is a valley in Oregon County in the U.S. state of Missouri.

Kelly Hollow has the name of the local  family.

References

Valleys of Oregon County, Missouri
Valleys of Missouri